The men's 3000 metres steeplechase at the 1938 European Athletics Championships was held in Paris, France, at Stade Olympique de Colombes on 5 September 1938.

Medalists

Results

Final
5 September

Participation
According to an unofficial count, 8 athletes from 6 countries participated in the event.

 (2)
 (2)
 (1)
 (1)
 (1)
 (1)

References

3000 metres steeplechase
Steeplechase at the European Athletics Championships